Mogamed Ibragimkhalilovich Ibragimov (born 22 July 1974) is a Macedonian naturalized wrestler of Avar descent.

At the 1996 Summer Olympics he competed for Azerbaijan and finished fifth in the freestyle 82 kg event.

He competed in the freestyle 85 kg competition at the 2000 Summer Olympics and won the bronze medal. He competed for Macedonia and became the first medalist for his country.

Four years later at the 2004 Summer Olympics he finished nineteenth in the freestyle 84 kg contest after being eliminated in the first round.

References

 FILA Wrestling Database

External links
 

1974 births
Living people
Macedonian male sport wrestlers
Olympic wrestlers of Azerbaijan
Olympic wrestlers of North Macedonia
Wrestlers at the 1996 Summer Olympics
Wrestlers at the 2000 Summer Olympics
Azerbaijani male sport wrestlers
Wrestlers at the 2004 Summer Olympics
Olympic bronze medalists for North Macedonia
Olympic medalists in wrestling
Sportspeople from Makhachkala
World Wrestling Championships medalists
Medalists at the 2000 Summer Olympics
Macedonian people of Avar descent